Argavieso refers to a Lordship in the kingdom of Aragón, Spain. The lords were originated in the bastard of Ferdinand II of Aragon (with his concubine Aldonça Roig d'Ivorra Alemany), Alonso de Aragón (Alphonse of Aragó), that was archbishop of Zaragoza born in 1470 and died in 1520. The title of Lord of Argavieso came from his concubine Ana de Gurrea y de Gurrea, lady of Argavieso. They had a son called Ferran (Hernando de Aragón, born in 1498 and died in 1577) who was the following lord (1520–77).

His son, Pere, was lord of Ballobar and Las Casetas. He had four sons: Joan (deceased 1598), lord of Ballobar and Las Casetas. After 1598, their brother Josep was proclaimed lord of Ballobar, but died without sons, and the successor was his sister, María (the cadet sister Agustine of Gurrea died without leaving behind any descendants). After María's death, the direct branch ended.

 
Aragon